was a professional wrestling event promoted by DDT Pro-Wrestling (DDT). The event took place on August 18, 2012, in Tokyo at the Nippon Budokan. The event featured ten matches, three of which were contested for championships. The event aired on Fighting TV Samurai.

Storylines
The Budokan Peter Pan event featured ten professional wrestling matches that involved different wrestlers from pre-existing scripted feuds and storylines. Wrestlers portrayed villains, heroes, or less distinguishable characters in the scripted events that built tension and culminated in a wrestling match or series of matches.

By winning the King of DDT tournament on July 8, Kenny Omega earned a title match in the main event against KO-D Openweight Champion Kota Ibushi.

Event
The dark match preceding the main card was the "Muscle Offers Time Musclehouse 10.5 Dark Match Rising", a twelve-man tag team match pitting wrestlers from DDT's sub-brand Muscle against wrestlers from the Style-E promotion.

In the opening ceremony, Sunplaza Nakano-kun performed a song on stage.

The Rumble rules match saw the participation of Yuzuki Aikawa from the joshi puroresu promotion World Wonder Ring Stardom. During the match, E.Yoshihiko, a blow-up doll with male make-up, captured the Ironman Heavymetalweight Championship by eliminating former champion DJ Nira, thus becoming the 960th champion. E.Yoshihiko was then eliminated by the eventual winner of the match, Yoshiaki Fujiwara who became the 961st champion. After the match, Hiroshi Fukuda attempted to pin Fujiwara but the newly crowned champion put Fukuda in a Fujiwara armbar to successfully defend his title.

The next match saw the debut of Konosuke Takeshita.

In the fifth match, two teams competed in a "5 vs. 5 Soccer match". The match consisted of two halves of 5 minutes each where each team tried to score the most falls by two-count pinfall or submission. In the case of a tie, the match was to be decided by an actual soccer penalty shoot-out. Amongst the participants were Tsukasa Fujimoto from Ice Ribbon, Yuji Hino from Kaientai Dojo and Yoshiko from World Wonder Ring Stardom.

In the sixth match, Mikami teamed with Tatsumi Fujinami from Dradition to challenge the KO-D Tag Team Champions Homoiro Clover Z (Kudo and Makoto Oishi).

The seventh match was a "Handicap Weapon Rumble" pitting Sanshiro Takagi against Minoru Suzuki. Unlike a traditional DDT Weapon Rumble where both participants bring their pre-selected weapons at regular intervals throughout the match, this match was a handicap match where Suzuki wasn't allowed to bring any weapon.

The eighth match, a hardcore match, involved Togi Makabe from New Japan Pro-Wrestling.

The ninth match was a "Transparent Electric Explosion Deathmatch", a parody of the "Explosive Barbed Wire Rope Deathmatch" stipulation used in hardcore promotions such as Frontier Martial Arts Wrestling, in which the explosions are non-existent but where the wrestlers and the referee act as if they were real. In this match, Danshoku Dino faced Invisible Man, an "invisible wrestler" i.e. non-existent.

Results

Gauntlet match

Rumble rules match

Footnotes

References

External links
The official DDT Pro-Wrestling website
Budokan Peter Pan at ProWrestlingHistory.com

DDT Peter Pan
2012 in professional wrestling
August 2012 events in Japan
Professional wrestling in Tokyo
2012 in Tokyo
Events in Tokyo